Peral may refer to:

Isaac Peral, the Spanish marine engineer
Peral (submarine), an early submarine design
Peral, Portugal, a civil parish in western Portugal